Konstantinos Flegkas (born 17 July 1988) is a water polo player of AEK Athens and Greece. He was part of the Greek team winning the bronze medal at the 2015 World Aquatics Championships.

He was a member of the team that competed for Greece at the 2016 Summer Olympics. They finished in 6th place.

Clubs
 Panionios: 2005–2012
 Nireas Lamias: 2012–2014
 Ydraikos: 2014–2019
 Panionios: 2019–2020
 AEK Athens: 2020–

See also
 Greece men's Olympic water polo team records and statistics
 List of men's Olympic water polo tournament goalkeepers
 List of World Aquatics Championships medalists in water polo

References

External links
 

Living people
1994 births
Place of birth missing (living people)
Greek male water polo players
Water polo goalkeepers
World Aquatics Championships medalists in water polo
Water polo players at the 2016 Summer Olympics
Olympic water polo players of Greece
Mediterranean Games silver medalists for Greece
Mediterranean Games medalists in water polo
Competitors at the 2018 Mediterranean Games
Water polo players from Athens